The 2022 Orlando USTA Pro Circuit Event was a professional tennis tournament played on outdoor hard courts. It was the third edition of the tournament which was part of the 2022 ITF Women's World Tennis Tour. It took place in Orlando, Florida, United States between 24 and 30 January 2022.

Singles main-draw entrants

Seeds

 1 Rankings are as of 17 January 2022.

Other entrants
The following players received wildcards into the singles main draw:
  Elvina Kalieva
  Ashlyn Krueger
  Whitney Osuigwe
  Sachia Vickery

The following players received entry from the qualifying draw:
  Sophie Chang
  Catherine Harrison
  Vera Lapko
  Tatjana Maria
  Robin Montgomery
  Sada Nahimana
  Marine Partaud
  Marcela Zacarías

The following players received entry as lucky losers:
  Hsu Chieh-yu
  Danielle Lao

Champions

Singles

  Zheng Qinwen def.  Christina McHale, 6–0, 6–1

Doubles

  Hailey Baptiste /  Whitney Osuigwe def.  Angela Kulikov /  Rianna Valdes, 7–6(9–7), 7–5

References

External links
 2022 Orlando USTA Pro Circuit Event at ITFtennis.com

2022 ITF Women's World Tennis Tour
2022 in American tennis
January 2022 sports events in the United States
2022 in sports in Florida